Tapinoma silvestrii is a species of ant in the genus Tapinoma. Described by William Morton Wheeler in 1928, the species is endemic to China.

References

Tapinoma
Hymenoptera of Asia
Insects described in 1928